Milwich is a civil parish in the Borough of Stafford, Staffordshire, England.  It contains 13 listed buildings that are recorded in the National Heritage List for England. Of these, one is at Grade II*, the middle of the three grades, and the others are at Grade II, the lowest grade.  The parish contains the villages of Milwich and Coton, and the surrounding countryside.  Most of the listed buildings are houses and farmhouses, the earlier of which are timber framed or have a timber framed core.  The other listed buildings are a church, a public house, a former toll house, and a disused watermill.


Key

Buildings

References

Citations

Sources

Lists of listed buildings in Staffordshire